Electric Loco Shed, Kazipet is a motive power depot performing locomotive maintenance and repair facility for electric locomotives of the Indian Railways, located at Kazipet of the South Central Railway zone in Telangana, India.

Operations
Being one of the three electric engine sheds in South Central Railway, various major and minor maintenance schedules of electric locomotives are carried out here. It has the sanctioned capacity of 100 engine units. Beyond the operating capacity, this shed houses a total of 172 engine units, including 100 WAG-7 and 72 WAG-9. Like all locomotive sheds, KZJ does regular maintenance, overhaul and repair including painting and washing of locomotives.

Markings
Kazipet loco shed has its own logo and stencils. Mostly the shed uses sticker logo.

Locomotives

References

Kazipet
Hanamkonda district
2006 establishments in Andhra Pradesh
Rail transport in Telangana
Transport in Warangal